Maureen "Mo" Ryan (born in 1966) is an American film and television critic, writer and reporter. From 2000 to 2018, she was a TV critic at the Huffington Post and the Chicago Tribune. From 2015 to 2018, Ryan was the chief TV critic for Variety. Ryan is currently a contributing editor at Vanity Fair.

Early life 
Ryan grew up in both Chicago's South Side and South Holland, Illinois. 

Ryan graduated from Chicago Heights Marian Catholic High School. In 1988, she graduated from Washington University in St. Louis with a double major in psychology and English. In 1993, Ryan received a master's degree in journalism from Northwestern University's Medill School of Journalism.

Career
From 1994 to 1998, Ryan edited and was chief contributor of the Chicago indie music zine, Steve Albini Thinks We Suck.

In 1992, Ryan began working at the Chicago Tribune. From 1997 to 2000, Ryan was an arts and entertainment editor, writer, and reporter. 
From 2000 to 2010, Ryan became the TV critic at the Trib. During her time there, Ryan created the Tribune's popular blog "The Watcher," which was nominated for an Espy Award.

From 2010 to 2015, Ryan worked at the Huffington Post as a TV critic.

In 2015, Ryan became the chief TV critic for Variety, a position she held until 2018.

In 2020, Ryan became a contributing editor at Vanity Fair.

Ryan has written for many publications including Broadcasting & Cable, Entertainment Weekly, MSNBC, NPR, Rolling Stone, Slate, among others.

#MeToo
In 2017, in the wake of #MeToo and the Harvey Weinstein scandal, Ryan revealed that she had been sexually assaulted in 2014 by a television executive, though for legal reasons she did not name him. Ryan said he was investigated after it happened, but continued to harass other women before he was hired by a different network. Ryan states this incident is what caused her two-month hiatus in 2015.

Personal life
Ryan lives with her husband and son in Chicago.

Membership
 2009-2015: Peabody Awards, Board of Jurors
 Television Critics Association, Board Member

Selected works and publications

References

External links 

 
 
 Maureen Ryan The Watcher at Chicago Tribune
 Maureen Ryan at Huffington Post
 Maureen Ryan at Variety

1966 births
Living people
American television journalists
American women television journalists
Washington University in St. Louis alumni
Medill School of Journalism alumni
Place of birth missing (living people)
Vanity Fair (magazine) people
Variety (magazine) people